David Lee Zwonitzer (born March 10, 1953) is an American politician and a Republican member of the Wyoming House of Representatives representing District 9 from 2007 until 2017, and District 8 since 2023. His son Dan is also a member of the Wyoming House.

Education
Zwonitzer earned his BS and MS in water resources from the University of Wyoming.

Elections
2012 Zwonitzer won the August 21, 2012 Republican Primary with 758 votes (52.1%), and won the four-way November 6, 2012 General election with 2,609 votes (63.2%) against Constitution candidate Skip Eshelman, Libertarian candidate Charles Kenworthy, and Wyoming Country Party candidate Perry Helgeson.
2006 Zwonitzer was unopposed for the August 22, 2006 Republican Primary, winning with 939 votes, and won the November 7, 2006 General election with 1,659 votes (56.4%) against Democratic nominee Sleeter Dover.
2008 Zwonitzer won the August 19, 2008 Republican Primary with 633 votes (69.0%), and won the November 4, 2008 General election with 2,332 votes (57.6%) against Democratic nominee Tony Reyes.
2010 Zwonitzer was unopposed for both the August 17, 2010 Republican Primary, winning with 1,179 votes, and the November 2, 2010 General election, winning with 2,321 votes.
2012 Zwonitzer won the Republican nomination and then defeated with 70 percent of the vote three third-party challengers in the general election.
2014 Zwonitzer won a fifth term for House District 9, securing 57% of the vote to defeat Democrat Mike Weiland.

References

External links
Official page at the Wyoming Legislature
 

1953 births
Living people
Republican Party members of the Wyoming House of Representatives
Politicians from Cheyenne, Wyoming
University of Wyoming alumni
21st-century American politicians